Muhammad Riaz Khan (Urdu:) was a Pakistan Army general who was the 6th Director-General of the Inter-Services Intelligence (ISI), serving from 1977 to 1979. Prior to that, he served at the General Headquarters as Adjutant-General of the Pakistan Army.

Riaz was well-regarded amongst the military establishment, and described as "religious minded, scrupulously honest, thoroughly professional and a committed soldier... a man of unimpeachable honesty and integrity." Although he presided over the ISI for a short term, his tenure, which occurred during Zia's era, coincided with a tumultuous period in Pakistan–U.S. relations: Bhutto's execution, the Carter administration's sanctions against Pakistan's nuclear program, the U.S. embassy burning in Islamabad, the Soviet buildup in Afghanistan, and the CIA's expanding cooperation with ISI.

Riaz died in 1979 from cardiac arrest. His post was seceded by Akhtar Abdur Rahman.

His son-in-law, Shahid Khaqan Abbasi, became a prominent politician and was appointed as the Prime Minister of Pakistan in 2017.

References

Year of birth missing
1979 deaths
Muhammad Riaz
Directors General of Inter-Services Intelligence
Pakistani generals
Punjabi people